Joseph John Issa, known as Joe or Joey Issa (born 1 December 1965), is a Jamaican businessman and philanthropist. He is best known as the founder of Cool Group, which comprises over 50 companies.
At age 30, Issa's first business venture was a petrol station named Cool Oasis, which was the catalyst for the Group becoming the largest  Jamaican owned operator of petrol stations in Jamaica. In 2003, he set up a telephone card distribution business called Cool Card. Later, he extended the distribution business to include automotive and household products, among others, under the Cool brand. 

Over the next decade, the Cool brand grew rapidly into a group of over 50 companies engaged in a wide variety of activities.

Early life 

Issa was born in Kingston. His father is Chairman of SuperClubs Resort, John Issa, 29 December 1939 – present. Issa's father was placed among the top 10 personalities of the decade 1990–2000. Issa received his secondary school education at Campion College in Kingston.

In 1985 he became the 11th member of the Issa families to attend College of the Holy Cross in Worcester, Massachusetts, USA, where he pursued an accountancy degree, which included one year at the London School of Economics (LSE) in the United Kingdom.
He graduated in 1988 and Valedictorian Cum Laude with a number of awards, including the youngest resident Jamaican to become a Certified Public Accountant (CPA).

Upon returning home from university, he joined SuperClubs Resorts, which his father had started in the early 1980s.

Career 
Issa started work as the purchasing manager at the Grand Lido Negril in Negril, Jamaica, one of SuperClubs chain of resorts. He became resident manager of the hotel a year later. During the next three years, Issa helped to reorganize the hotel as a resort for romantic vacations and honeymooners.

In 1991, he assumed the position of general manager of Couples Hotel, the first to be established as an all-inclusive by his father in 1978 when Issa was 12 years old.  He oversaw the refurbishment of the hotel. Issa was moved to the money-losing Grand Lido San Souci, which he made profitable within six months.
 
In 1995, Issa was promoted to President of Development and Special Projects in the corporate office, a position in which he was involved in developing the various brands, including the establishment of new properties. He was subsequently promoted to Senior VP of Sales in 1996, and initiated a customer satisfaction program which led to increased bookings and sustained brand loyalty through repeat visits.

In 1999, when Issa became executive vice oresident, he instituted marketing programmes, including the establishment of a new website to take reservations online 24/7, which led to higher occupancy levels. He remained at the helm of SuperClubs until 2003, when he left to concentrate his own business, the Cool Group of Companies trading as Cool Corp.

Business ventures 
In 1994 created a company called Cool Corp, and started by opening a petrol station in Saint Ann's Bay, Jamaica named Cool Oasis. The company grew strategically over the years as Issa engaged in various business ventures.

In 2001, Cool Automotive Distributors was established to deliver motor oil and lubricants to gas stations, auto stores, companies with fleet vehicles and trucking companies. IN 2014, it is one of the leading retailers of automobile-related lubricants and accessories in Jamaica, and also sells basic household products such as toilet paper and soap.

In 2002, Issa formed Cool Card to distribute telephone cards in Jamaica and Trinidad and Tobago, offering phone cards from Jamaica's three cellular phone providers, Digicel, Cable & Wireless and MiPhone, and both cellular providers in Trinidad and Tobago, Digicel and Bmobile. In 2003, he created Cool Biz, and introduced 'EZ Card'  an electronic top-up of telephone credit operated by over 3,000 individuals.

In 2005, Issa started Cool Petroleum, which became the licensed user of Shell brands in Jamaica. The company distributed Shell bulk fuels, Shell chemicals and Shell lubricants, and  operasted an extensive network of more than 50 Shell service stations.

In April 2006, Issa started Cool Cash Loans, a provider of loans for micro businesses.

Other business ventures include:

 Cool Gear - Shops selling island-themed clothing and other merchandise.
 Cool Beach Stuff – Shops outfitting beachgoers with swimsuits, sunscreen, sunglasses, beach towels, T-shirts, etc.
 Blue Thunder – A brand of general-purpose motor oil made in the US and sold through Cool Automotive Distributors.
 Cool Tours – Offers a range of day tours in Jamaica.
 Cool Signs - A full-service sign/advertising company.
 Cool Connection - A pay-as-you-go high-speed Internet service provider for business travelers and tourists.
 Cool Chemicals – A distributor of raw materials serving industries such as paint and coatings, thinner, foam, packaging, adhesives, automotive, brake fluid, coolants, solvents etc.
 Cool Casino – A casino located in Aruba.
 Cool Radio – Jamaican radio station with a 75 percent “talk” and 25 percent music format.
 Cool Kidz Stuff – Shops offering children's clothing, fashion accessories, and swimsuits.
 Cool Wind – A brand of air conditioning units sold in Jamaica.

Activism 
Issa undertook a number of extra-curricular activities while attending College of the Holy Cross in the U.S. He was the founder and editor of Holy Cross Journal of Political Economy in 1988. He also had a radio programme through which he informed of Jamaica's culture and heritage while playing Reggae music.
While attending London School of Economics, he became President of the Afro-Caribbean Society, a multi-ethnic group which undertakes high-level discussions on social, political and economic development throughout the world.

Issa also founded a charity, Educate the Children Fund, while at LSE and was active in fundraising to send school books to Caribbean children.

When he returned to Jamaica in 1988, his passion for advocacy did not wane, especially as it relates to a credible social and economic environment, and accountability in governance.

In 2000, Issa participated in media discussions on the impact of the high murder rate on foreign direct investments (FDIs) and economic growth in Jamaica. Issa also commented on the state of the tourism industry, advocating for government support to the small hotel sector and seeking to stem a brewing controversy of variable head tax rates for different cruise ship ports.

In 2001, Issa addressed public concerns about political corruption by suggesting paying politicians more, Issa had based his position on KPMG Peat Marwick figures which showed that politicians earn significantly less than top civil servants and private sector counterparts.

The following year, ahead of the 16 October, general elections, Issa took a stand for accountability in governance with what became known as the "Issa Initiative", calling for those seeking political office sign a pledge with their constituents promising that if elected, they would address two pivotal issues in their constituencies within a reasonable period of time. The idea resonated with people across the country and was supported by the two main political parties – the Jamaica Labour Party and the People's National Party. The Gleaner newspaper called it a watershed in Jamaica's political culture, and said "the proposal from Joe Issa of the St. Ann Chamber of Commerce, which was taken up by the island's Chambers of Commerce has the potential of bringing about a change in the relationship between constituents and their elected representatives," and that "it would require a greater level of consultation between those who are seeking political office and those who they hope to represent, on the priority needs of the constituencies."  A cartoon in The Gleaner depicted a politician telling an agitated female constituent, "just vote fi mi an' yu get light, water, telephone, roads, etc.", while Issa steps behind him with a covenant and pen, asking, "care to sign a pledge for just two of those?"

Issa represented the island's 13 Chambers of Commerce during negotiations with the government concerning the Cess on street lights, intervening to avoid a threatened protest march.

Philanthropy 

In 1987, Issa founded the "Educate the Children Fund" while attending the LSE. The school adopted the program, and the Fund was officially launched by Jamaica's then Acting High Commissioner in London, Dale Anderson. In his remarks, Anderson said Issa's initiative was particularly welcome at a time of scarce resources.
A year later, after completing his studies at College of the Holy Cross and becoming a Certified Public Accountant (CPA), Issa launched the Joe Issa Holy Cross/Jamaica Scholarship Fund, which provided a scholarship to a talented undergraduate Jamaican child once every four years to attend his alma mater university.
In 1991, while he was working at his parents' SuperClubs Grand Lido Negril resort, Issa launched a cricket and tennis training programme for young children in the parish of Negril.

In the new millennium, Issa founded another charity, "Global Education 2000", to help Jamaican schools by partnering them with their US counterparts. The initiative has resulted in the implementation of various exchange programmes which have benefited several Jamaican schools and were widely reported in the Jamaican media.
Also, while, at SuperClubs, Issa helped employees at the resorts to buy and develop land under a project called "People Development Programme".

Since 2003, as Chairman of Cool Corporation, a group of 'Cool' branded companies that cut across many industries, Issa has set up Cool Charities, and has donated hundreds of computers, books, air conditioners and other school-related supplies primarily to educational institutions in the parishes of St. Mary and St. Ann.

Issa volunteers as a Justice of the Peace (JP) for the parish of St Mary. He is a former director of First Global Bank, Guardian Life Limited and Supreme Ventures Limited; and board member of Seville Great House.

He has been bestowed with an honorary life membership of the Rotary and Kiwanis clubs and is a past President of the St. Ann Chamber of Commerce.

Also, since 1983, Issa has been serving as a Eucharistic Minister for the Catholic Church.

Honours and awards 
Issa was Valedictorian for the Class of 1988, a first for an international student and an Economics/Accounting major in the 148-year history of College of the Holy Cross, where he graduated with honours – Cum Laude.
He made history again in 1988, when he became the youngest resident Jamaican to pass all four parts of the prestigious Certified Public Accountant examination in one sitting; and was awarded the Most Outstanding Junior Student by the Massachusetts Society of CPAs Inc.
Issa is a member of several honours societies, namely, Phi Beta Kappa, Alpha Sigma Nu, and Omicron Delta Epsilon and a Dana Scholar.

In 1994, at age 29, he was presented with the Young Hotelier of the World award by the International Hotel Association in Sydney, Australia. He was among Travel Agent Magazine's 100 Rising Stars for four consecutive years – 1997–2000.

Soon after taking charge as Executive Vice-President of SuperClubs in 1999, Issa succeeded in increasing bookings and building brand loyalty, which earned him the Jamaica Observer's Tourism's Brightest Spark award and a place among Jamaica's top 10 personalities for that year. The following year, he was among Jamaica's 10 sexiest men.

Since venturing into his own business in 2003, Issa has received several more awards for "developing a multifaceted group of companies that provide employment for hundreds of people in St. Ann, and in the process creating a powerful 'Cool' brand that is being leveraged abroad".

References 

1965 births
Jamaican businesspeople
Living people
People from Kingston, Jamaica
Jamaican justices of the peace